Maria Donati (1898–1966) was an Italian stage, film and television actress.

Selected filmography
 Five to Nil (1932)
 The Ferocious Saladin (1937)
 The Count of Brechard (1938)
 Life Begins Anew (1945)
 Departure at Seven (1946)
 L'onorevole Angelina (1947)
 The Transporter (1950)
 The Passaguai Family (1951)

References

Bibliography
 Maurizio Porro & Ernesto G. Laura. Alida Valli. Gremese Editore, 1996.

External links

1898 births
1966 deaths
Italian film actresses
Actresses from Rome